Kazachy is a rural locality (a selo) in Kundursky Selsoviet of Arkharinsky District, Amur Oblast, Russia. The population was 2 in 2018. There is 1 street.

Geography 
Kazachy is located on Trans-Siberian Railway, 84 km southeast of Arkhara (the district's administrative centre) by road. Kundur is the nearest rural locality.

References 

Rural localities in Arkharinsky District